Kuzhimathicadu is a small village near Kundara, Kollam, India. Kuzhimathicadu is the downtown area for nearby villages.

References

 Villages in Kollam district